Mildred "Miria" Amelia Woodbine Pomare   ( Johnson, 24 December 1877 – 7 September 1971), also known as Miria Tapapa, was a New Zealand  community leader. Of Māori descent, she identified with the Rongowhakaata and Te Aitanga-a-Mahaki iwi. She was born in Ahipakura in Poverty Bay, New Zealand in 1877.

She was appointed an Officer of the Order of the British Empire in the 1918 New Year Honours.

Pomare died on 7 September 1971.

References

1877 births
1971 deaths
Te Aitanga-a-Māhaki people
Rongowhakaata people
New Zealand Officers of the Order of the British Empire
People from the Gisborne District